Transformers: Robots in Disguise is an American animated television series, developed by Adam Beechen, Duane Capizzi and Jeff Kline. The series' first 13 episodes were released online on December 31, 2014 on 1905.com in mainland China (excluding Hong Kong) and dubbed in Mandarin Chinese. The series first premiered on television on February 9, 2015 on Canal J in France. In the United States, the series has been broadcast on Cartoon Network since its debut on March 14, 2015. The series serves as a stand-alone sequel to Transformers: Prime, taking place a few years after it with an overall more lighthearted tone.

The series focuses on Bumblebee who, following the events of Prime, has become a police officer on Cybertron. While on a mission, he sees a vision of Optimus Prime telling him to go to Earth as a terrible evil is coming. Joining him on the mission are his cadet partner Strongarm and the rebellious Sideswipe. Following their arrival on Earth, the three of them are tasked with capturing Decepticons who were released from their stasis pods when their prison ship, the Alchemor, crash landed. The trio is also aided by the humans Russell and Denny Clay, the Dinobot Grimlock, and the Minicon Fixit. Later, they are joined by the former Decepticon-turned-Autobot bounty hunter Drift, with his Minicon pupils Slipstream and Jetstorm, and the spiritual Windblade who is on a mission by the Transformers' god Primus. The first season, consisting of 26 episodes, concluded with the revival of Optimus.

A second season, consisting of 13 episodes began airing on February 20, 2016 and saw Bumblebee's team, or Bee Team, attempting to apprehend the remaining escaped Decepticons and the discovery that the Alchemor was cut in half upon crashing on Earth, leading to the creation of a different Decepticon group. The season also features the return of Soundwave and Ratchet from Transformers: Primethe former appearing for one episode while the latter appears in the two-part finale. A miniseries, consisting of six episodes, premiered in October 2016 and features the return of Starscream, placing him as the main antagonist. In April 2017, the series' third season, entitled Combiner Force, began airing and focuses on Bee Team's realization that they can combine into the Combiner, Ultra Bee, as well as the arrival of the Stunticons, who are also capable of combining. Soundwave also plans to return with the help of Activators, a new breed of Minicons.

The series concluded with its third season and was replaced with the new series, Transformers: Cyberverse. Presently, only the first season of the series has been released on DVD in Region 1. In Region 4 season 1 is available as a complete DVD set while subsequent seasons (2, 3 and the 2016 miniseries) have been released in parts, as individual DVDs containing 4–7 episodes each.

Series overview

Episodes

Season 1 Decepticon Hunters (2015)

Season 2 Decepticon Hunters (2016)

Miniseries Mini-con Weaponizers (2016)

Season 3: Combiner Force (2017)

Online shorts

DVD releases

References

General references

External links
 

Robots in Disguise (2015 TV series)
Lists of American children's animated television series episodes
Lists of Cartoon Network television series episodes